Justin Haley may refer to:

 Justin Haley (baseball) (born 1991), American professional pitcher
 Justin Haley (racing driver) (born 1999), American stock car racing driver